Level Up is a UK children's TV programme that was broadcast on CBBC. It was launched on 3 April 2006, replacing Xchange. The show is an hour long and was broadcast during the school year, from 7:30am until 8:30am. During the school holidays, including Bank Holidays, the show aired from 9.30am until 10:30am.

The show was presented by Mark Rhodes and Sam Nixon who rose to fame after coming second and third, respectively, in the second series of Pop Idol. They were assisted by Ayesha Asantewaa, presenter of The Big Toe Radio Show, who read out the "Glitches and Fixes". It was transmitted live from studio TC10 at BBC Television Centre in London.

The first series completed its four-month run after it finished on 1 September 2006. A second series for 2007 was initially planned, although this eventually became Do Something Different.

Experts
Sam and Mark were aided by young experts from a particular field. An integral part of the show, they occasionally presented a section of the programme live in the studio with Sam and Mark, explaining about how viewers could get involved, i.e. the environmental expert, Sarah , encouraged viewers to be more eco-friendly or Rishi, the technology expert, who informed viewers about the latest technological developments.
The experts were:

Incidentally, two of the 'experts' have featured on the work experience part of the show, The Next Level.

Gamers
On each programme, three of the twelve gamers were contacted at home via a webcam using Skype, although the connection was often temporarily lost. They joined in with the discussions, are set challenges, try to help out with the 'glitches and fixes', and make video diaries of special events/trips/holidays they go on.

The twelve gamers from the first series:
 Maria
 Avijit
 Callam
 Chloe
 Eleanor
 Lauren
 Rhys
 Naomi
 Ryan
 Alice
 Bradley
 Sam

Sam won the 12th Gamer competition.

The Gamer Weekender
The Gamer Weekender was a special weekend arranged by Level Up of fun and challenges and the chance for all the gamers to meet up. The weekender included several logic, team and competitive challenges with prizes at the end. For each team challenge they passed the gamers would receive two or three 'creds' (heavy weights) which they used to try to raise up a water level in a tall transparent cylinder. In the end, the gamers didn't quite raise the water level high enough but were given another chance and finally managed to raise the water level and win the prize of a ride in a limousine, a helicopter flight and a barbecue prepared by Sam & Mark.

Glitches and fixes

Glitches and Fixes
Glitches and Fixes was the part of the show where Ayesha sorts through the 'glitches' and 'fixes'. 'Glitches' were problems which the viewers send in, either as a plain text message or a video.

'Fixes' were the other viewers suggestions to these problems which they phone, text or email in. The best were published on the programme's website for other viewers to vote on the top five.

Group glitches
Group glitches were glitches sent in by a group (e.g. friends, club, etc.) that would require more effort to fix than normal glitches.  Group glitches were fixed by sending along a pro-gamer - someone who specialized in the field of the glitch - e.g. a girls football club sent in a group glitch and Level Up sent along one of the England's top women's football players to help them.

See also
 Sam and Mark

External links
 The Next Level - Radio Journalist on the BBC Kent Web site.
Sam Nixon.net
 Mark Rhodes Forum- forum for mark fans

BBC children's television shows
2006 British television series debuts
2006 British television series endings
English-language television shows